Feride Rushiti is a Kosovan activist, director of the "Kosovo Center for the Rehabilitation of Torture Survivors" (QKRMT) and is one of the pioneering human rights activists in Kosovo. Rushiti received the U.S. Secretary of State's International Women of Courage Award from US First Lady Melania Trump on 23 March 2018.

She completed her studies at the Faculty of Medicine in Tirana, Albania in 1997 where she specialized in gastroenterology.

In the aftermath of the 1998-1999 Kosovo war Rushiti mobilized a team of 45 health professionals from Kosovo, for post-war returnees and survivors of torture.

After more than a decade of lobbying by women activists, including Feride Rushiti, survivors are entitled to compensation as victims of war. She interceded with Bedri Hamza, the minister for finance, when rumours began that the compensation would be low. They started enrolling in February 2018. War rape survivors can receive $ 280 (about 228 Euro) in monthly compensation.

References 

Living people
Year of birth missing (living people)
Kosovan gastroenterologists
Recipients of the International Women of Courage Award